An obelus (plural: obeluses or obeli) is a term in codicology and latterly in typography that refers to a historical annotation mark which has resolved to three modern meanings:
 Division sign 
 Dagger 
 Commercial minus sign  (limited geographical area of use)

This is the same root as that of the word 'obelisk'.

In mathematics, the first symbol is mainly used in Anglophone countries to represent the mathematical operation of division and is called an obelus. In editing texts, the second symbol, also called a dagger mark , is used to indicate erroneous or dubious content; or as a reference mark or footnote indicator.  It also has other uses in a variety of specialist contexts.

Use in text annotation 

The modern dagger symbol originated from a variant of the obelus, originally depicted by a plain line , or a line with one or two dots . It represented an iron roasting spit, a dart, or the sharp end of a javelin, symbolizing the skewering or cutting out of dubious matter.

Originally, one of these marks (or a plain line) was used in ancient manuscripts to mark passages that were suspected of being corrupted or spurious; the practice of adding such marginal notes became known as obelism. The dagger symbol ,  also called an obelisk, is derived from the obelus, and continues to be used for this purpose. 

The obelus is believed to have been invented by the Homeric scholar Zenodotus, as one of a system of editorial symbols. They marked questionable or corrupt words or passages in manuscripts of the Homeric epics.

In some commercial and financial documents, especially in Germany and Scandinavia, a variant is used in the margins of letters to indicate an enclosure, where the upper point is sometimes replaced with the corresponding number. In Finland, the obelus (or a slight variant) is used as a symbol for a correct response (alongside the check mark, which is used for an incorrect response).

In mathematics

The form of the obelus as a horizontal line with a dot above and a dot below, was first used as a symbol for division by the Swiss mathematician Johann Rahn in his book Teutsche Algebra in 1659. This gave rise to the modern mathematical symbol , used in anglophone countries as a division sign. This usage, though widespread in Anglophone countries, is neither universal nor recommended: the ISO 80000-2 standard for mathematical notation recommends only the solidus  or fraction bar for division, or the colon  for ratios; it says that  "should not be used" for division.   

This form of the obelus was also occasionally used as a mathematical symbol for subtraction in Northern Europe; such usage continued in some parts of Europe (including Norway and, until fairly recently, Denmark). In Italy, Poland and Russia, this notation is sometimes used in engineering to denote a range of values.

In some commercial and financial documents, especially in Germany and Scandinavia, another form of the obelus the commercial minus sign is used to signify a negative remainder of a division operation.

See also
  used for obelism.
 
 
 
 List of typographical symbols and punctuation marks

References

Typographical symbols